Joseph Henry Millbank (30 September 1919 – February 2002) was an English footballer active in the 1930s and 1940s. He made a total of 39 appearances in The Football League for Queens Park Rangers and Crystal Palace.

References

1919 births
English Football League players
Gillingham F.C. players
Queens Park Rangers F.C. players
Crystal Palace F.C. players
Wolverhampton Wanderers F.C. players
2002 deaths
Association football midfielders
English footballers